Yarpur is a village in Misrikh tehsil, Sitapur district, Uttar Pradesh, India.  The population was 519 at the 2011 Indian census.

References

Villages in Sitapur district